Loverdos is a Greek surname. Notable people with the surname include:

 Andreas Loverdos (born 1956), Greek politician
 Nikos Loverdos, Ottoman cyclist

Greek-language surnames